Fabrício Daniel de Souza (born 23 July 1997), known as Fabrício Daniel or simply Fabrício, is a Brazilian footballer who plays as a right winger or forward for Coritiba.

Club career
Born in Araraquara, São Paulo, Fabrício finished his formation with Ferroviária, and made his senior debut while on loan at Noroeste in 2015. He made his first team debut for AFE on 2 September 2016, starting and scoring the third in a 3–0 Copa Paulista away win against Matonense.

On 4 January 2017, Fabrício signed a three-year contract with Santos, being initially assigned to the B-team. On 1 March 2019, he was loaned to Cianorte until the end of the season.

Fabrício made his professional debut on 22 March 2019, coming on as a second-half substitute for Fernandinho and scoring the winner in a 2–1 away defeat of Paraná for the Campeonato Paranaense championship. On 2 December, he returned to Noroeste after his contract with Santos expired.

On 19 June 2020, Fabrício joined Série B side Cuiabá on a three-month deal. On 23 September, after his deal expired, he moved to Mirassol in the Série D, and helped the club win their first national trophy in their history by netting 11 goals.

Career statistics

Honours
Mirassol
Campeonato Brasileiro Série D: 2020

References

External links

1997 births
Living people
People from Araraquara
Brazilian footballers
Association football forwards
Campeonato Brasileiro Série A players
Campeonato Brasileiro Série B players
Campeonato Brasileiro Série C players
Campeonato Brasileiro Série D players
Associação Ferroviária de Esportes players
Esporte Clube Noroeste players
Santos FC players
Cianorte Futebol Clube players
Cuiabá Esporte Clube players
Mirassol Futebol Clube players
América Futebol Clube (MG) players
Coritiba Foot Ball Club players
Footballers from São Paulo (state)